Ardozyga pyrrhica is a species of moth in the family Gelechiidae. It was described by Turner in 1919. It is found in Australia, where it has been recorded from Queensland.

The forewings are reddish brown. The stigmata are obsolete, but there is a fine fuscous line on the apical half of the costa interrupted by several minute whitish-ochreous dots. A dark-fuscous apical spot gives off a fine line along the upper part of the termen. The hindwings are grey.

References

Ardozyga
Moths described in 1919
Moths of Australia